FabricLive.81 is a 2015 DJ mix album by Monki. The album was released as part of the FabricLive Mix Series.

Track listing
 FPI Project - Rich In Paradise (Going Back To My Roots) 
 Arma - Vex 
 Deapmash & Raito - Stop (Strip Steve Remix) 
 DJ Dealer & Groove Junkies feat. Chezere - My Day Has Come (DJ Dealer Prime Time Vocal) 
 DJ Haus - I Can Feel It 
 Bot & Tony Quattro - Guess Who 
 Doctor Jeep feat. TT The Artist - Bang 
 Sly One - Cowbell 
 Melé - Angorra + Additional vocals by Chimpo 
 DJ Spen presents DJ Technic - Gabryelle 
 FCL - It's You (San Soda’s Panorama Bar Acca Version) + Adesse Versions - Pride (Dub) 
 Eddie Mercury - A Lo Mejor 
 Floorplan - Baby, Baby 
 DJ Haus - Helta Skelta 
 Kalyde - Infected Ear 
 Melé and Mak & Pasteman - Do You Rex 
 Mella Dee - Rude & Deadly 
 Callahan - Fallacy 
 Tony Quattro - Zulu Carnival 
 Gage - Telo (Sudanim Remix) + Additional vocals by Slick Don 
 Danny Daze & 214 - Las Caderas 
 Golden Girls - Kinetic (Frank De Wulf Remix)

External links

FabricLive.81 at Fabric

References

Fabric (club) albums
2015 compilation albums